The 1st Conference of the 7th Season of the Shakey's V-League was held in April 2010 at the Filoil Flying V Arena. Second Conference shall be governed by the FIVB Official Volleyball Rules. The participating teams is the same as the last conference, but without the two Visayan teams.

The Shakey's V-League is an intercollegiate women's volleyball league in the Philippines formed in 2004 by a management group led by former PBA commissioner Jun Bernardino and pizza company Shakey's.

Tournament format
Preliminaries
The ten (10) participating teams will be divided into two pools. The top four (4) teams in each pool will advance to the quarterfinals.
In the event of a two-way tie for 4th place, the tie will be resolved by a play-off game.
Quarter-finals
The number one and number three seeded teams in each pool will be taken and will compose a new pool while the number two and number four seeded teams will make up the other pool. 
Another round robin will be played in the set of pools with the record of a team against another team whom they previously met in the eliminations will be carried over.
If two teams are tied for 2nd place, FIVB Rules shall apply to determine the best two which will play-off to resolve the tie.
Semi-finals
A best-of-three series will be played between the 1st seed of a pool and the 2nd seed of the other pool.
Finals
A best-of-three series will be played between the 2 winners of the semis for the gold.
A best-of-three series will be played between the 2 losers of the semis for the bronze.
If the gold medalist is determined in two (2) games, the series for the bronze medal will also end in two (2) games. If the contenders for the bronze are tied after two (2) games, then FIVB Rules will determine the winner.

Eliminations

Pool A

Pool B

Quarterfinals

Pool C

Pool D

Bracket

Semifinals

UST vs. Lyceum

Lyceum leads series, 1-0

Series Tied, 1-1

UST wins series, 2-1

San Sebastian vs. Ateneo

SSC-R leads series, 1-0

SSC-R wins series, 2-0

Finals

Bronze series

Ateneo leads series, 1-0

Ateneo wins series, 2-0

Championship series

UST leads series, 1-0

Series Tied, 1-1

UST wins series, 2-1

Final ranking
Champion - 
1st runner-up - 
2nd runner-up - 
3rd runner-up -

Awards
Best Scorer: Jaroensri Bualee (SSC-R)
Best Attacker: Aiza Maizo (UST)
Best Blocker: Nasella Nica Gulliman (Lyceum)
Best Setter: Jenelyn Belen (SSC-R)
Best Digger: Lizlee Ann Gata (Adamson)
Best Server: Nicolette Ann Tabafunda (Lyceum)
Best Receiver: Pornthip Santrong (Lyceum)
Conference MVP: Suzanne Roces (SSC-R)
Finals MVP: Aiza Maizo (UST)

Shakey's V-League conferences
2010 in Philippine sport